Makuta is an Indian visual effects and animation company based in Santa Clara, CA with branches in Hyderabad, India and Universal City, CA. The company received the National Film Awards in 2010 and 2012 for "Magadheera" and "Eega" respectively. Founded by Pete Draper, Adel Adili and R.C. Kamalakannan in 2010 off the success of their collaboration on SS Rajamouli's Magadheera, the trio brought in private investment and technical advisors from the entertainment and technology industries to their board of directors, such as Dasaradha Gude, Raja Koduri and SS Rajamouli along with long-time collaborator A.V. Dorababu as studio lead. As per agreement, Rajamouli exited from the board of directors after two calendar years during the production of Eega and Kamalakannan personally exited in 2012. Draper, Adili and Dorababu have been spearheading the studio's operations since. 

It is a fully-fledged visual effects facility covering a full gamut of requirements from active on-set visual effects supervision through to immersive digital set extension, digital matte painting, high-end feature animation and effects work, clean-up, motion tracking and final compositing. Makuta branched into LiDAR Scanning in 2013 and was the first visual effects studio in India to start offering this service with the use of Faro LiDAR scanning hardware. The studio has championed creative education in the country with its senior members providing student workshops and parental guidance.

In 2012, Makuta also won the Best Visual Effects at the Filmfare awards and CineMAA Awards for "Eega".

It gave VFX to Bahubali: The Beginning, Bahubali the conclusion, 2.0, Saaho, Sye Raa Narasimha Reddy, RRR and many more.

Filmography
* Denotes yet to be released

Awards

References 

Mass media companies established in 2010
Companies based in Hyderabad, India
Best Special Effects National Film Award winners
2010 establishments in Andhra Pradesh